Father Don't Cry is a single/EP released in 1991 by Doubting Thomas.  It has been re-released in 1997 on Metropolis Records with additional material.  Both versions are out-of-print.

The original version of the song "Father Don't Cry" is included on Doubting Thomas' full-length, The Infidel.

Track listings

1991 release
"Father Don't Cry (Extended)" – 8:36
"Turn a New Leaf" – 8:16
"Xcrement" – 5:59
"Movie 13" – 3:17 ┼
"That Problem Child" – 4:14 ┼

┼ Above tracks appear only on the CD and cassette versions only.

1997 release
"Father Don't Cry (Extended)" – 8:36
"T.H.C." – 4:36
"Turn a New Leaf" – 8:16
"Xcrement" – 5:59
"Movie 13" – 3:17
"That Problem Child" – 4:14
"Majickal Horse" – 2:23
"Come In Piece" – 4:00

"T.H.C." and "Majickal Horse" are previously unreleased. These tracks were recorded in 1994, and added to the re-release.

"Come In Piece" is also included on The Infidel.

Personnel
cEVIN Key
D.R. Goettel

Liner notes
Produced, engineered, and mixed by cEVIN Key, D.R. Goettel, and Dave "Rave" Ogilvie. Edited by Anthony Valcic. Additional editing by Marc Ramaer.

References

External links
 Doubting Thomas official website.

1991 EPs
Doubting Thomas (band) albums